Agrupación Deportiva El Pardo is a Spanish football club from Madrid in the Community of Madrid, in Spain. Founded in 1963, its stadium is Estadio Mingorrubio.

History

The AD El Pardo is a club of the city of Madrid, founded in 1963. 
In the 1990/1991 season he played in Tercera División (Level 3). Currently, in the (2011–12 season) playing in the Tercera de Aficionados (Level 8). Its decline time began in the 2006/07 season when ended the league with 3 points in Preferente (Level 5), in 2007/08 ended with 23 points in Primera Aficionados (Level 6) and came back down and now again has to be in decline and -3 point penalty. Since 2019 Cesar Ávila is the new president of AD El Pardo.

Season to season

1 seasons in Tercera División

External links
futmadrid.com profile
ffmadrid.es profile

Football clubs in Madrid
Divisiones Regionales de Fútbol clubs
Association football clubs established in 1963
1963 establishments in Spain